Pandemis cataxesta is a moth of the family Tortricidae. It is found in China and Vietnam.

References

Moths described in 1938
Pandemis